Michael John Hugg (born 11 August 1940) is a British musician who achieved fame as a founding member of the 1960s group Manfred Mann.

Biography
Hugg was born in Gosport, Hampshire in 1940. His parents condoned his jazz drumming as long as he continued his piano lessons. Pursuing a career in jazz, he met Manfred Mann while working as a musician at Butlin's Clacton, and they formed a seven-piece group. The Mann-Hugg Blues Brothers recruited Paul Jones and later Tom McGuinness. On signing with HMV Records their producer, John Burgess, changed their name to Manfred Mann.

Hugg is a competent pianist and an able vibraphone player, but his main role in Manfred Mann was as drummer. However, he recorded several vibraphone solos with the band (e.g. "I'm your Kingpin") and used the instrument to augment hits such as "Oh No Not My Baby". He was credited as co-writer of the group's early hits and contributed solo compositions throughout its life, including jazzy instrumentals ("Bare Hugg") and wistful acid-pop ("Funniest Gig", "Harry the One Man Band"). His abilities as a songwriter grew throughout the group's career, though Hugg became progressively unhappy with the band's commercial output, describing the group's single "Ha! Ha! Said the Clown", in an interview with Melody Maker as one of the five worst records he had ever heard.

He and his brother composed "Mister, You're a Better Man Than I" which was recorded by the Yardbirds in 1965. Hugg also composed the majority of the songs for the 1968 Paramount film Up the Junction. By this time Hugg was already branching out into film and television composition. After composing for Up The Junction, he wrote incidental music to a BBC Wednesday Play, and contributed to the score for the Jesús Franco film Venus in Furs in 1969, together with Manfred Mann. He co-wrote the theme music to the BBC TV comedy series Whatever Happened to the Likely Lads in 1972 (along with Ian La Frenais, one of the scriptwriters for the series), followed by the score to the 1976 feature film.

Between 1967 & 1968 Hugg helped write & produce songs for The Cherry Smash, a group that included his brother Bryan Sebastian, along with Mick Gill, John Curtis, Graham Hunt, and Mark Tuddenham. 
Their singles were:
1967 - Sing Songs of Love/Movie Star (on the Track label)
1968 - Goodtime Sunshine/Little Old Country Home Town (on the Decca label)
1968 - Fade Away Maureen/Green Plant (on the Decca label)

When he and Manfred Mann formed the more progressive Manfred Mann Chapter Three, taking inspiration from Dr. John and free jazz and touring with a five-piece brass section, Hugg moved to electric piano and lead vocals. He took the latter role, by his own account, purely because no-one better was available. One of its themes was used as the soundtrack of a TV advertisement for cigars. Hugg released two solo albums, and one album with the band Hug in the 1970s.

Today, apart from his role as keyboard player with the Manfreds, a reformed version of the 1960s band (without Manfred Mann) who tour the UK and Europe regularly, Hugg is part of the jazz trio, PBD.

Discography

Solo
 1972 Somewhere
 1973 Stress & Strain

Manfred Mann Chapter Three
 1969 Manfred Mann Chapter Three
 1970 Manfred Mann Chapter Three Volume Two
 1971 Manfred Mann Chapter Three Volume Three (unreleased)

Hug
 1975 Neon Dream

See also  
 Manfred Mann discography

References

External links
 Mike Hugg on the Manfreds' official website
 
 
 

1942 births
British rhythm and blues boom musicians
English rock drummers
English rock keyboardists
English songwriters
Living people
Manfred Mann members
People educated at St John's College, Portsmouth
People from Gosport
The Manfreds members